Aÿ-Champagne is a commune in the Marne department, northern France. The municipality was established on 1 January 2016 and consists of the former communes of Aÿ, Mareuil-sur-Ay, and Bisseuil. They keep their names and town halls.

Population
The population data given in the table below refer to the commune in its geography as of January 2020.

Champagne

Aÿ 
Aÿ is most famous as a centre of the production of Champagne. Aÿ's vineyards are located in the Vallée de la Marne subregion of Champagne, and are classified as Grand Cru (100%) in the Champagne vineyard classification. Many prestigious Champagne houses own vineyards in the immediate vicinity, and several producers are located in Aÿ, including Ayala and Bollinger.

Mareuil-sur-Aÿ 
Its vineyards are located in the Vallée de la Marne subregion of Champagne, and are classified as Premier Cru (99%) in the Champagne vineyard classification. Together with Tauxières-Mutry it is the highest rated of the Premier Cru villages, and has therefore just missed out on Grand Cru (100%) status.

See also 
Communes of the Marne department

References 

Communes of Marne (department)